Line 18 may refer to:

China
 Line 18 (Chengdu Metro)
 Line 18 (Chongqing Rail Transit) (under construction)
 Line 18 (Guangzhou Metro)
 Line 18 (Shanghai Metro)

Other countries
 Line 18 (São Paulo Metro), Brazil (cancelled)
 Line 18 (Stockholm Metro), a Green line, Sweden
 Line 18 (Zürich), or Forch railway, Switzerland
 Paris Métro Line 18, France (planned)
 Line 18, serving the Sinsen Line of the Oslo Tramway, Norway